Les or Leslie Adams may refer to:
 Les Adams (politician) (born 1974), American politician from Virginia
 Les Adams (rugby league) (1909–1945), English rugby league footballer
 Les Adams (DJ) (1955–2019), English DJ and producer
 Leslie Adams (composer) (born 1932), American composer